The EWF American Championship is the next most prestigious professional wrestling title in the Southern California-based Empire Wrestling Federation independent promotion behind the EWF Heavyweight Championship. It was established in 1999, with Mr. Quick who was awarded the title from the EWF. There have been a total of 24 recognized champions who have had a combined 30 official reigns.

Title history

References

External links
 EWF American Championship

Empire Wrestling Federation championships
Heavyweight wrestling championships
Regional professional wrestling championships